Meaux may refer to:
Meaux, a town in the Seine-et-Marne department, France
Arrondissement of Meaux
Canton of Meaux-Nord
Canton of Meaux-Sud
CS Meaux, football club
CS Meaux (WBC), a wheelchair basketball club
Meaux-la-Montagne, a commune in the Rhône department, France
Meaux Abbey and Meaux, East Riding of Yorkshire, a hamlet in the East Riding of Yorkshire, England
Meaux, Louisiana, an unincorporated area in Vermilion Parish, Louisiana, USA

People
Huey P. Meaux, American record producer
Meaux, the French surname was the origin of surname Moe** or Mow given to some of the immigrants to the United States from France in the 1600s. It was not uncommon for spellings to be simplified phonetically when immigrating to the United States. (**Of different ancestry than Moe or Moen surnames of Norwegian ancestry and origin.)